The People's Commissariat of Defence of the Soviet Union was the highest military department of the Soviet Union from 1934 to 1946.

History
In the 1920–1930s, the highest military authority of the Russian Socialist Federative Soviet Republic/Soviet Union was called the People's Commissariat for Military and Naval Affairs.

On June 20, 1934, the People's Commissariat for Military and Naval Affairs of the Soviet Union was transformed into the All-Union People's Commissariat for Defence of the Soviet Union. On December 30, 1937, the People's Commissariat of the Navy of the Soviet Union was allocated from it.

On February 1, 1944, in connection with the adoption of the Law of the Soviet Union on the creation of military formations of the Union republics, the People's Commissariat of Defence of the Soviet Union was transformed from the All–Union People's Commissariat into the Union–Republican. The Russian Soviet Federative Socialist Republic has created its own People's Commissariat of Defence.

On February 25, 1946, by decree of the Presidium of the Supreme Council of the Soviet Union, the People's Commissariat of Defence of the Soviet Union merged with the People's Commissariat of the Navy of the Soviet Union into a single Union–Republican People's Commissariat of the Armed Forces of the Soviet Union. Under this name, the central authority was designated in documents for less than a month, since in accordance with the Law of the Soviet Union of March 15, 1946 on the transformation of the Councils of People's Commissars of the Soviet Union and Union Republics into Councils of Ministers, it was renamed the Ministry of Armed Forces of the Soviet Union. On February 25, 1947, in accordance with the aforementioned decisions, amendments were made to the Constitution of the Soviet Union.

The printing organ of the People's Commissariat for Military and Naval Affairs in the part of the General Staff was the Military Affairs magazine.

The central organ of the People's Commissariat of Defence of the Soviet Union to educate the commanding and rank-and-file staff of the Red Army, to promote combat training tasks and to develop advanced military thought was the Krasnaya Zvezda newspaper.

People's Commissars
Clement Voroshilov (June 20, 1934 – May 7, 1940)
Semen Tymoshenko (May 7, 1940 – July 19, 1941)
Joseph Stalin (July 19, 1941 – February 25, 1946)

Key Documents

Structure

On July 26, 1940
General Staff of the Red Army,
General Directorate of Political Propaganda of the Red Army,
Main Directorate of the Air Forces of the Red Army,
Main Artillery Directorate of the Red Army,
Main Armored Directorate of the Red Army,
Main Military Engineering Directorate of the Red Army,
Main quartermaster department of the Red Army,
Department of combat training of the Red Army,
Air Defense Administration of the Red Army,
Office of Communications of the Red Army,
Office of the Military Chemical Defense of the Red Army,
Red Army Fuel Supply Administration,
Management of higher military educational institutions of the Red Army,
Department of military educational institutions of the Red Army,
Office of the Red Army
Sanitary Administration of the Red Army,
Veterinary Administration of the Red Army,
Office of the People’s Commissar of Defense,
Finance Department at the People’s Commissar of Defense.

See also
Ministry of Defense of the Soviet Union
General base
Ministry of Defense of the Russian Federation

References

Sources

External links
 List of Orders of the People's Commissar of Defense of the Soviet Union
 Diplomats of the People's Commissariat of Defense: On the Eve and During the War on the Website of the Ministry of Defense of Russia

Command and control
Military of the Soviet Union